The 2002–03 Turkish Cup was the 41st edition of the annual tournament that determined the association football Super League (Süper Lig) Turkish Cup champion under the auspices of the Turkish Football Federation (TFF). Trabzonspor successfully contested Gençlerbirliği 3–1 in the final. The results of the tournament also determined which clubs would be promoted or relegated.

First round

|}

Second round

|}

Third round

|}

Bracket

Quarter-finals

|}

Semi-finals

Summary table 

|}

Matches

Final

References

External links
Turkish Football Federation 

Turkish Cup seasons
Cup
2002–03 domestic association football cups